ODK may refer to:

 Omicron Delta Kappa
 ODK (software)